The 1953 Lady Wigram Trophy was a motor race held at the Wigram Airfield Circuit on 28 February 1953. It was the third Lady Wigram Trophy to be held and was won by Ron Roycroft in the Alfa Romeo Tipo B. This was the third straight win for the Tipo B car and Roycroft completed the weekend in dominant fashion achieving pole position and the fastest lap as well as the race win.

Classification

References

Lady Wigram Trophy
Lady
February 1953 sports events in New Zealand